Miss World 1967, the 17th edition of the Miss World pageant, was held on 16 November 1967 at the Lyceum Ballroom in London, UK. 54 contestants competed for the Miss World. The winner was Madeline Hartog-Bel represented Peru. She was crowned by Miss World 1966, Reita Faria of India. Hartog-Bel was a semi-finalist of Miss Universe 1966.

Results

Contestants

  – María del Carmen Sabaliauskas †
  – Judy Lockey
  – Christl Bartu
  – Mauricette Sironval
  – Wilza de Oliveira Rainato
  – Donna Marie Barker
  – Therese Fernando
  – Margarita Téllez Gabell †
  – Marjorie Furniss
  – Laila Michaelides
  – Alzbeta Strkulova
  – Sonja Jensen
  – Margarita Rosa Rueckschnat Schott
  – Laura Elena Baquero Palacios
  – Hedy Rannari
  – Carole Noe
  - Janie Jack
  – Ruth Kocher
  - Mimika Niavi  
  – Araba Martha Vroon
  – Laura Bassadone
  – Shakira Baksh
  – Monica van Beelen
  – Alba María Bobadilla
  – Hrefna Wigelund Steinþórsdóttir
  – Gemma McNabb
  – Dalia Regev
  – Tamara Baroni
  – Laurel Williams
  – Chikako Sotoyama
  – Zipporah Mbugua
  – Chung Young-hwa
  – Sonia Fares
  – Marie-Joseé Mathgen
  – Mary Mifsud
  – María Cristina Ortal
  – Naima Benjelloun
  – Pamela McLeod
  – Roseline Balogun
  – Vigdis Sollie
  – Carlota Lozano
  – Madeleine Hartog-Bel
  – Margarita Favis Gomez †
  – Teresa Amaro
  – Disa Duivenstein
  – Eva Englander
  – Edith Fraefel
  – Theresa Shayo
  – Rekeja Dekhil
  – Nese Yazicigil
  – Rosemary Salmon
  – Jennifer Lynn Lewis
  – Pamela Valari Pall
  – Irene Böttger González
  – Aleksandra Mandić

Notes

Debuts
 Czechoslovakia, Panama, Tanzania, and Uganda competed in Miss World for the first time.

Returning countries
 Ghana last competed in 1959.
 Kenya last competed in 1960.
 Nigeria last competed in 1963.
 Portugal last competed in 1964.
 Australia, Austria, Peru, and Tunisia last competed in 1965.

Other Notes
  - Madeline Hartog-Bel was also competed at Miss Universe 1966 in just 17 months prior.

References

External links
 
 Pageantopolis – Miss World 1967

Miss World
1967 in London
1967 beauty pageants
Beauty pageants in the United Kingdom
November 1967 events in the United Kingdom